Liam Doyle may refer to:
 Liam Doyle (hurler) (born 1969), Irish hurler
 Liam Doyle (Gaelic footballer), Gaelic football player from County Down, Northern Ireland
 Liam Doyle (footballer) (born 1992), Manx footballer